The Laval City Council is the governing body in the mayor–council government in the city of Laval, Quebec, Canada. It is composed of the mayor and 21 councillors. They are elected to four year terms with the next election scheduled for November 2025. Statutory meetings are held on the first Monday of each month.

Sectors
Currently the city is divided into six sectors (secteurs in French) which only approximately cover the territories of the former municipalities. They are:

Sector 1
 Duvernay
 Saint François
 Saint Vincent de Paul
Sector 2
 Laval des Rapides
 Pont Viau
 Renaud

Sector 3
 Chomedey

Sector 4
 Fabreville Ouest
 Îles Laval
 Laval Ouest
 Laval sur le Lac
 Sainte Dorothée

Sector 5
 Fabreville Est
 Sainte Rose

Sector 6
 Vimont
 Auteuil

The former city of Fabreville was divided among two sectors.

Members

2021–present

2017–2021
Following the November 5, 2017 municipal election, the following city councillors and mayor were elected:

2013–2017
Following the November 3rd 2013 elections, the following city councillors were elected:

Prior to the 2013 elections, all 21 councillors has been associated with the Parti PRO des Lavallois, the municipal political party of mayor Gilles Vaillancourt. Following Vaillancourt's resignation as mayor on November 9, 2012, the councillors voted to dissolve the party on November 19, 2012 and sat as independents.

Following Vaillancourt's resignation, councillor Basile Angelopoulos served as the city's acting mayor until council selected Alexandre Duplessis, the former councillor for District 15 (Saint-Martin), as the new mayor on November 23. Angelopoulos again undertook the responsibilities of pro-mayor upon Duplessis' resignation on June 28, 2013 until Martine Beaugrand, the former councillor for District 20 (Fabreville) was acclaimed as the city's new mayor on July 3, 2013.

References

External links 
 Official website to Laval

Municipal councils in Quebec
Politics of Laval, Quebec